Bikaner is a city in the northwest of the state of Rajasthan, India. Bikaner city is the administrative headquarters of Bikaner District and Bikaner division. The Collector and District Magistrate of Bikaner is Sh. Bhagwati Prasad Kalal, and the Superintendent of Police is Tejaswini Gautam IPS.

Formerly the capital of the princely state of Bikaner, the city was founded by Rao Bika in 1488 CE and from its small origins it has developed into the fourth largest city in Rajasthan. The Ganges Canal, completed in 1928, and the Indira Gandhi Canal, completed in 1987, facilitated its development.

History

Prior to the mid 15th century, the region that is now Bikaner was a barren wilderness called Jangladesh.

Rao Bika established the city of Bikaner in 1488. He was the first son of Maharaja Rao Jodha of the Rathore clan, the founder of Jodhpur and conquered the largely arid country in the north of Rajasthan. As the first son of Jodha he wanted to have his own kingdom, not inheriting Jodhpur from his father or the title of Maharaja. He therefore decided to build his own kingdom in what is now the state of Bikaner in the area of Jangladesh. Though it was in the Thar Desert, Bikaner was considered an oasis on the trade route between Central Asia and the Gujarat coast as it had adequate spring water. Bika's name was attached to the city he built and to the state of Bikaner ("the settlement of Bika") that he established. Bika built a fort in 1478, which is now in ruins, and a hundred years later a new fort was built about 1.5 km from the city centre, known as the Junagarh Fort.

Around a century after Rao Bika founded Bikaner, the state's fortunes flourished under the sixth Raja, Rai Singhji, who ruled from 1571 to 1611. During the Mughal Empire's rule in the country, Raja Rai Singh accepted the suzerainty of the Mughals and held a high rank as an army general at the court of the Emperor Akbar and his son the Emperor Jahangir. Rai Singh's successful military exploits, which involved winning half of Mewar kingdom for the Empire, won him accolades and rewards from the Mughal emperors. He was given the jagirs (lands) of Gujarat and Burhanpur. He was an expert in arts and architecture, and the knowledge he acquired during his visits abroad is amply reflected in the numerous monuments he built at the Junagarh fort.

Maharaja Karan Singh, who ruled from 1631 to 1639, under the suzerainty of the Mughals, built the Karan Mahal palace. Later rulers added more floors and decorations to this Mahal. Anup Singh, who ruled from 1669 to 1698, made substantial additions to the fort complex, with new palaces and the Zenana quarter, a royal dwelling for women and children. He refurbished the Karan Mahal with a Diwan-i-Am (public audience hall) and called it the Anup Mahal. Maharaja Gaj Singh, who ruled from 1746 to 1787 refurbished the Chandra Mahal (the Moon Palace).

During the 18th century, there was an internecine war between the rulers of Bikaner and Jodhpur and also amongst other thakurs, which was put down by British troops.

Following Maharaja Gaj Singh, Maharaja Surat Singh ruled from 1787 to 1828 and lavishly decorated the audience hall (see illustration) with glass and lively paintwork. Under a treaty of paramountcy signed in 1818, during Maharaja Surat Singh's reign, Bikaner came under the suzerainty of the British, after which the Maharajas of Bikaner invested heavily in refurbishing Junagarh fort.

Dungar Singh, who reigned from 1872 to 1887, built the Badal Mahal, the 'weather palace', so named in view of a painting of clouds and falling rain, a rare event in arid Bikaner.

General Maharaja Ganga Singh, who ruled from 1887 to 1943, was the best-known of the Rajasthan princes and was a favourite of the British Viceroys of India. He was appointed a Knight Commander of the Order of the Star of India, served as a member of the Imperial War Cabinet, represented India at the Imperial Conferences during the First World War and the British Empire at the Versailles Peace Conference. His contribution to the building activity in Junagarh involved separate halls for public and private audiences in the Ganga Mahal and a durbar hall for formal functions. He also built the Ganga Niwas Palace, which has towers at the entrance patio. This palace was designed by Sir Samuel Swinton Jacob, the third of the new palaces built in Bikaner. He named the building Lalgarh Palace in honour of his father and moved his main residence there from Junagarh Fort in 1902. The hall where he held his Golden Jubilee (in 1938) as Bikaner's ruler is now a museum.

Ganga Singh's son, Lieutenant-General Sir Sadul Singh, the Yuvaraja of Bikaner, succeeded his father as Maharaja in 1943, but acceded his state to the Union of India in 1949. Maharaja Sadul Singh died in 1950, being succeeded in the title by his son, Karni Singh (1924-1988). The Royal Family still lives in a suite in Lalgarh Palace, which they have converted into a heritage hotel.

Climate

Bikaner is situated in the middle of the Thar desert and has a hot desert climate (Köppen climate classification BWh) with very little rainfall and extreme temperatures. In summer temperatures can exceed 48 °C, and during the winter they may dip below freezing.

The climate in Bikaner is characterized by significant variations in temperature.

Demographics

 the population of Bikaner city was 644,406 placing it in the top 70 major cities of India and 5th in Rajasthan. The female to male ratio in the city was 904/1,000. The literacy rate in the city was about 79%, male literacy being 87% and female literacy being 71%.

Majority of the population of the city follows Hinduism, with followers of Islam a large minority. The city has a substantial followers of Jainism.

Transport
Bikaner railway station is a major railway junction in the North Western Railway zone of Indian Railways. The first railway link to Bikaner was established on 9 December 1891 as part of Jodhpur State Railway and it has undergone many administrative modifications since then.
 
Today Bikaner Railway Station is efficiently well connected to National Capital Delhi and Rajasthan State's capital Jaipur along with major Indian cities like Jodhpur, Sri Ganganagar, Rewari, Howrah, Kolkata, Mumbai, Kanpur, Agra, Allahabad, Surat, Ahmedabad, Vadodara, Pathankot, Bhatinda, Amritsar, Haridwar, Jammu, Chandigarh, Pune, Hisar, Bengaluru, Chennai, Hyderabad, Guwahati, Puri, Coimbatore, Thiruvananthapuram, Bhubaneswar, Bilaspur, Indore, Jalandhar, Baroda, Ratangarh, Jaisalmer, Barmer, Alwar, Nagaur, etc.

Bikaner is well served with roads and is linked directly to Delhi, Jaipur, Agra, Sri Ganganagar, Jodhpur, Alwar, Rewari, Narnaul, Ludhiana, Bhatinda, Ambala, Panipat, Surat, Ahmedabad, Ajmer, Haridwar, Jaisalmer, Bhilwara, Churu, Sikar and many other cities. 

Central Bus Stand is the main bus station in Bikaner. It connects Bikaner to other cities in Rajasthan and nearby states via road.

Bikaner has Domestic Civil Airport Nal Airport which is located 15 km west of the city. Regular flights to Jaipur JAI and Delhi DEL commenced in 2017-18 under UDAN scheme of Narendra Modi Govt.

Cuisine
The city is most famous for its savoury snack Bikaneri bhujia which is sold all over the world and also have geographical indication (GI) tag to keep its originality intact. Other special food items for which Bikaner is well known are Bajre ki Roti (Chapati made up of Pearl millet flour), Dal baati Churma, Ghevar, Halvas, Papads/Papadum, Rasgulla, Gulab Jamun, Kachori and Samosa.

Places of interest

Junagarh Fort

The Junagarh Fort was built around 1594 CE by Raja Rai Singh. The fort was originally called Chintamani. It is one of the few major forts in Rajasthan which was not built on hilly terrain. The modern city of Bikaner has developed around the fort. The fort is studded with temples, grand palaces and huge pavilions and walls. In 1961, a museum was set up by Maharaja Karni Singh. Its temples and palaces are preserved as museums and provide insight into the grandiose living style of the past Maharanas of Rajasthan.

Laxmi Niwas Palace

The Laxmi Niwas Palace is a former residential palace built by Maharajah Ganga Singh, the ruler of the former state of Bikaner. It was designed by the British architect, Samuel Swinton Jacob in the year 1902. The style of architecture is Indo-Saracenic. It is now a luxury Heritage hotel owned by the royal family of Bikaner.

Rao Bikaji's Fort
Rao Bikaji's first fort, 'Bikaji Ki Tekri' built in 1478 is now in ruins. A hundred years later a new fort was built about 1.5 km from the city centre, named Junagarh Fort.

Karni Mata Temple

The Karni Mata (करणी माता) Temple or the Rat Temple of Rajasthan is situated around 30 km away from the Bikaner city and is dedicated to goddess Karni Mata, a famous mystic of her times, believed to be an incarnation of goddess Durga. The locals will be quick to point out that the creatures running around in the temple are not rats, they are kaaba. Kaabas are believed to be reincarnations of humans who had been devotees of Karni Mata, and the brevity of human life did not sufficiently satisfy their devotion.

The shrine of Karni Mata can be found in the town of Deshnoke 30 km south from Bikaner on the road to Jodhpur. Karni Mata is worshiped as an incarnation of Goddess Durga.

Mukam Bishnoi Temple
The Mukam Temple, also known as Mukti Dham Mukam, is located near Nokha. The Mukam is a holy place of 29 rules of followers of Bishnois. Bishnoi sect was founded by Guru Jambeshwar. Bishnois are quite protective of nature. Mukam Temple is the place where the soul of guru Jambeshwar lies.

Laxminath Temple 
Built by Maharaja Rao Lunkaran, Shri Laxminath Temple is one of the oldest temples in Bikaner and just 4 kilometres away from the famous Junagarh Fort. Lord Vishnu and Goddess Laxmi, grace the sacred sanctum of the temple. The most exquisite artwork inside the temple apart from the shrines is the doorway which is embellished in silver work. Festivals like Janmashtmi, Nirjala Ekadashi, Rama Navami, Diwali and Gita Jayanti are majorly celebrated at the temple.

Bhandasar Jain Temple 

Bhandasar Jain Temple is known for its beautiful leaf paintings, frescoes and ornamented mirror work. This temple was constructed by Bhandasa Oswal in the 15th century. This temple is constructed using red sandstone with beautiful paintings on walls and pillars of the sanctum and mandapa. The temple is dedicated to the 5th Tirthankara sumatinatha. The temple consist of garbhagriha, antarala, mahamandapa, and ardhamandapa.

Wildlife
A variety of wild animals including various birds, mammals and reptiles are found in Bikaner's Semi-Arid climate. Initiatives are being taken to bring back the number of vultures which have dwindled at a staggering rate before. There are around 600 resident vultures at Jorbeer. The region is host to another 1200 migratory vultures. Local varieties include Egyptian and King Vultures. The most common migratory vulture is Eurasian Griffon coming from Spain and Turkey. Other migratory vultures include Cinereous and Himalayan Griffons.

Saw-scaled Viper is also natively found in Bikaner.

Gajner Wildlife Sanctuary is located 32 km west of the Bikaner city.

Animal Husbandry

National Research Centre on Camels, Bikaner

National Research Centre on Camels was established in 1984 in Bikaner by the Central Government under Indian Council of Agricultural Research at the outskirts of Bikaner city to promote research and development related to camels such as effective breeding, utilisation of camel milk. Scientists engage with all stakeholders like Camel herders, traders via collaborative programmes and significant growth had been made. A camel museum is available to apprise them of the developmental and research aspects of the camel in the desert ecosystem. Maharaja Ganga Singh of the Indian State of Bikaner founded Bikaner Camel Corps around 1890 and became a part of the BSF in Independent India.

Cow sanctuary
The Rajasthan government has decided to set up its first cow sanctuary in Bikaner. It has a dedicated Ministry of Cow Husbandry. The sanctuary is likely to be set up near Amarpura village, about 70 km from Bikaner.

Education 

Educational Institutes located in Bikaner are  Sardar Patel Medical College,  Government Engineering College Bikaner, Government Polytechnic College Bikaner, Maharaja Ganga Singh University, Rajasthan University of Veterinary and Animal Sciences, Swami Keshwanand Rajasthan Agricultural University, and Bikaner Technical University.

Fairs and festivals

International Camel Festival
International Camel Festival is held every year in January. Organised by the Department of Tourism, Art and Culture, the city celebrates the festival in honour of the "Ship of the Desert – The Camel". 
Beautifully adorned camels and performances by artists from different regions are the key attraction for both domestic and foreign tourists. The event includes spectacular camel performances like Camel dances, Camel races, Neck shaking Camel rides.

Competitions like Mr Bikana and Miss Marwan are also held during the festival.

See also
 Magra sheep
 Bikaner State
 List of universities and colleges in Bikaner
 List of schools in Bikaner, Rajasthan

References

External links
 
 District Government Site

 
1488 establishments in Asia
15th-century establishments in India
Articles containing potentially dated statements from 2008
All articles containing potentially dated statements
Populated places established in the 1480s
Former capital cities in India
15th-century Jain temples